Gladys Egan (also credited as Gladys Eagan; May 24, 1900March 8, 1985) was an early 20th-century American child actress, who between 1907 and 1914 performed professionally in theatre productions as well as in scores of silent films. She began her brief entertainment career appearing on the New York stage as well as in plays presented across the country by traveling companies. By 1908 she also started working in the film industry, where for six years she acted almost exclusively in motion pictures for the Biograph Company of New York. The vast majority of her screen roles during that period were in shorts directed by D. W. Griffith, who cast her in over 90 of his releases. While most of Egan's films were produced by Biograph, she did work for other motion-picture companies between 1911 and 1914, such as the Reliance Film Company and Independent Moving Pictures. By 1916, Egan's acting career appears to have ended, and she no longer was being mentioned in major trade journals or included in published studio personnel directories as a regularly employed actor. Although she may have performed as an extra or in some bit parts after 1914, no available filmographies or entertainment publications from the period cite Egan in any screen or stage role after that year.

Early life and stage work
Born in Manhattan, New York in May 1900, Gladys was the fifth child of seven children of Margarette (née Sheeran) and Thomas Francis Egan, both New York natives whose own parents had immigrated from Ireland. By 1910, the large Egan family was living at 425 West 30th Street in Manhattan and was supported by Thomas's job as a "letter carrier" for the United States Postal Service. 

The circumstances of young Gladys's entry into show business are uncertain, but by the age of seven she was performing on Broadway. In October and early November 1907, credited as Gladys Eagan, she portrayed the character "Ne-Ne-Moo-Sha" in the two-act musical comedy Miss Pocahontas, which was presented at the Lyric Theatre on 42nd Street in Manhattan. During this period, the young actress was also a regular cast member in stage productions outside of New York. In its November 23, 1907 issue, the weekly entertainment newspaper The New York Clipper lists Egan as a cast member in the Samuel S. & Lee Shubert Company's presentation of the play Shore Acres, which was scheduled for a three-week engagement in Boston, Massachusetts.

19081909 travels
Throughout 1908 and into early 1909, Egan performed on tour in additional presentations of Shore Acres and in at least two other plays: Rip Van Winkle starring the popular New York actor Thomas Jefferson and The Wishing Ring featuring Marguerite Clark. Egan in those tours received many accolades for her performances in towns and cities in California, Utah, Colorado, North Dakota, Pennsylvania, and Montreal, Canada. In his mixed assessment of Rip Van Winkle, reviewer Walter Anthony in the January 25, 1909 issue of The San Francisco Call focuses special attention on the production's child actors, noting that their portrayals of the play's characters as children were in his opinion far superior to the older versions of the same characters performed by adult actors. "Little Meenie [Egan] and Little Heindrich in the first act", he writes, "were good juvenile roles in the hands of Gladys Egan and Oscar Johnson, but not so good when their grownups  selves appeared in the fourth act stagily and rhetorical. A month later, when Rip Van Winkle was scheduled to be presented in Grand Junction, Colorado, the local newspaper heaped even greater praise on Egan:

In other news coverage about Egan's stage work in 1909, The Salt Lake Herald in Utah described the "little" actress as "one of the stars of the performance" of Rip Van Winkle and judged her acting style as highly effective for her age. "The emotional tremor in her voice as she expostulated over the ejection of her father", observed the newspaper, "was truly mindful of the great actresses who get their names in big letters on the billboards."

Film career
In 1908 and 1909, when Egan was having success on the stage, she also ventured into acting in the rapidly expanding industry of motion pictures. Her initial screen performance was for the Biograph Company in the summer of 1908. Contrary to some current online filmographies relating to Egan, published biographies of D. W. Griffith, production records included in the 1985 reference D. W. Griffith and the Biograph Company, and other period sources cite the drama short Behind the Scenes as her first work for the New York studio. The eight-minute short, directed by Griffith, was filmed in two daysAugust 10 and 13, 1908at the company's main studio at 11 East 14th Street in Manhattan. Released on September 11, the film was promoted by Biograph in advertisements as "a true and pathetic story of life in Stageland, where all that glitters is not gold."

The Adventures of Dollie
In the cinematic history of the United States, the 1908 Biograph short The Adventures of Dollie is deemed notable because it is generally recognized as D. W. Griffith's debut film as a director. Some online references also cite The Adventures of Dollie as Gladys Egan's first film as a screen actor. She is not listed as a cast member of that production in any of the previously noted sources or in the catalog profiles of surviving copies of the short preserved in the UCLA Film Archives and in the Library of Congress. As presented in those copies of The Adventures of Dollie, the child actress who portrays the title character does not appear to be Egan, who by the summer of 1908 was eight years old. The girl in the film looks younger than that age, and her short hairstyle and facial features do not resemble those of Egan at the time. Even in the previously cited reference D. W. Griffith and the Biograph Company, which among its many sources includes performance credits for Egan drawn from the studio's production records, does not credit her or any other child actor for the role of Dollie. Instead, that reference indicates that the performer is unknown, applying only a question mark ("?") to the title role. Egan herself also made no mention of this film in a self-compiled 1965 list of her leading roles.

Continuing work at Biograph, 19081913 

Despite any issues regarding the identity of Egan's first film, her initial work for Biograph must have impressed Griffith because he cast her in dozens of productions over the next five years, mostly in melodramas. A few examples of Egan's films are Behind the Scenes (1908), Romance of a Jewess (1908), After Many Years (1908), The Lonely Villa (1909), The Country Doctor (1909), The Seventh Day (1909), The Rocky Road  (1910), The Broken Doll (1910), His Trust Fulfilled  (1911), Conscience (1911),  A Child's Remorse (1912), The Painted Lady (1912), Fate (1913), and Red and Pete, Partners (1913). By the end of 1913, she had performed in at least 100 Biograph releases working for Griffith as well as for some of the company's other rising directors such as Herbert Brenon, Frank Powell, Anthony O'Sullivan, Edward Dillon, and Mack Sennett.

In her 1925 autobiography When the Movies Were Young, silent-film actress Linda Arvidson, who was also D. W. Griffith's first wife, recalls Egan's work for the legendary director at Biograph:

Egan's number of roles at Biograph steadily declined after 1912. Although there may have been other reasons for her reduced screen work at the company, that same year Mary Pickford introduced Director Griffith to 19-year-old Lillian Gish and to her sister Dorothy, who was four and a half years younger than her sibling. The sisters were described at the time as looking younger than their chronological ages, especially Lillian. On her first visit to Biograph in June 1912, she reportedly convinced the studio's casting director that she was only 16 years old, not 19. After meeting the "Gish girls", Griffith soon assigned them co-starring roles in his production An Unseen Enemy, released in September 1912. Their casting in subsequent Biograph films and the sisters' rising popularity with theater audiences may account, at least in part, for Egan's declining number of roles in company productions. The arrival of Lillian and Dorothy likely reduced Egan's opportunities too of getting more substantial roles at Biograph as she entered her teenage years.

Biograph's anonymous actors
In compiling a comprehensive filmography of Egan, a full accounting of her screen appearances and those of other Biograph actors in the early 1900s is made more difficult by the fact that Biograph, as a matter of company policy, did not begin publicly crediting its performers and identifying them in film-industry publications or in newspapers until 1913. In its April 5 issue that year, the Chicago-based trade journal Motography in a news item titled "Biograph Identities Revealed" announces that "at last" Biograph "is ready to make known its players." That news item also informs filmgoers that for the price of ten cents they can purchase a poster from the company that features the names and photographs of 26 of Biograph's principal actors. While Lillian and Dorothy Gish were identified among the group of actors on the poster, Gladys Egan's name and photograph were not included.

Egan's work for other studios and her final film

Egan appeared in a small number of productions for several studios other than Biograph. Between 1911 and 1914, she was cast by the Reliance Film Companyalso headquartered in Manhattanin The Empty Crib (1911), His Love of Children (1912), Votes for Women (1912), and Dream House (1913). In the latter film, once again credited as "Gladys Eagan", she was among a cast described as a "Clever Company of Well Known Stage Children", a group that included Runa Hodges, who was billed as "The Prettiest Baby in the World". The Independent Moving Pictures Company of America, more commonly referred to by the acronym "IMP", also cast Egan in four of it releases in 1912: The Romance of an Old Maid; Mrs. Matthews, Dressmaker; All for Her; and The Heart of a Gypsy. Two other film studios that contracted Egan for roles were the Solax Film Company and the Photo Drama Company (PDC). For Solax she performed in the Western Two Little Rangers (1912) under the direction of Alice Guy-Blaché. The next year, at PDC, she portrayed the character Mary Morgan in Ten Nights in a Barroom, a drama directed by Lee Beggs and based on an 1854 temperance novel by Timothy Shay Arthur. 

According to a few of her filmographies, after her work for other studios in 1912 and 1913, Egan returned to Biograph to perform in a minor role, again uncredited, in the company's 1914 three-reeler Men and Women co-starring Lionel Barrymore and Blanche Sweet. In that release, possibly Egan's final film, she portrayed one of several orphans in the drama. Two years later, the 16-year-old actress was no longer being mentioned in trade publications or included in studio personnel directories as a regularly employed actor. Nevertheless, in a film-industry directory published in Motion Picture News in October 1916, she still promoted herself in personal advertisements as a specialist in "Ingenue" roles and that she was available for hire through the Amalgamated Photoplay Service of New York City.

Later years
Following the 1916 publication of her personal advertisement seeking acting work, Egan is not mentioned again in available trade journals of the period or in theatre and film sections in local or regional newspapers. Later documentation, however, suggests that after her screen career she remained in New York City, married in 1920, then divorced, and later secured employment outside the entertainment industry. The federal decennial census of 1930, in a population survey taken on April 23 at the Wells House, a hotel in Brooklyn, New York, documents a 29-year-old, divorced Gladys M. Eagan residing there with 13 other "guests" and employed as an office secretary. The age of that woman is consistent with the former actress's own birth year and her parents are identified as natives of New York as well. The spelling of "Eagan" was also a common variation of her surname used in her early stage career as well as in film promotions for studios other than Biograph, one example being The Dream House (1913) for the Reliance Film Company. Subsequent census data and other records do show that in the late 1930s Egan left New York and relocated to Detroit, Michigan, where she resided for over a decade. She then moved to California by the early 1950s. No contemporary records, however, have been uncovered that show Egan ever returning to acting in those new locations, either in professional or amateur productions.

Personal life and death
Egan married three times. The details of her first marriage in 1920, as noted, are uncertain. Records do document and confirm that in the mid-1930s she married John Edson Jacoby, a native of Michigan who was an automobile "sales engineer". During their marriage they had one child, a daughter, Joyce Angela Jacoby, who was born in 1936. The federal census of 1940 shows four-year-old Joyce residing with her parents in Detroit, where John continued his work in the automobile industry. Gladys's marriage to him lasted until 1948, when he died.

Twelve years after John Jacoby's death, on June 26, 1960, Gladys married Melvin Babbitt Rice in California, but that union was a short one, and Rice died only six months after the couple's wedding. No subsequent records indicate that Egan married again.

The final years of Egan's life were spent in a nursing home in Chula Vista, California. In March 1985, at age 84, she died in the Cresta Loma Convalescent Hospital in nearby Lemon Grove, California, still using the name Gladys Egan Jacoby. Following cremation, her ashes were scattered by the Telophase Society in accordance with her wishes.

Selected filmography

Notes

References

External links

1900 births
1985 deaths
Actresses from New York City
20th-century American actresses
American child actresses
American film actresses
American silent film actresses